The 1995–96 A-League season was the first year of a rebranded Australian National Soccer League (NSL) and the twentieth since the national league began in 1977. The competition was variously known as the A-League and the Ericsson Cup (as part of a sponsorship arrangement) at the time.

Background
After an attempt to reduce the number of NSL teams from 14 to 12, the Australian Soccer Federation announced that a new competition known as the A-League would operate in parallel to the NSL. After a series of legal challenges, the A-League became the sole national league with largely the same composition of teams as the previous NSL season. The change was seen at the time as a rebranding rather than a new competition. Prior to the season beginning, the league announced a sponsorship agreement with Ericsson that was supposed to last until 2000, though was terminated a year early in mid-1999. The sponsorship led to the league being renamed the Ericsson Cup, though the A-League and NSL names were still used in various forms.

The commencement of the season was delayed as relegated teams Melbourne SC and Heidelberg United obtained court injunctions to prevent the league going ahead. Eventually the injunction was lifted in the Federal Court of Australia to allow the league to start, albeit several weeks late.

Changes from 1994–95
Parramatta Eagles, Melbourne SC and Heidelberg United were excluded from the national league, while Newcastle Breakers returned after a one-season absence. The Canberra Cosmos entered the league for the first time.

Sydney Olympic signed a deal with the University of Technology Sydney (UTS) to become known as UTS Olympic.

After using penalty shootout to break ties in 1994–95, the draw returned for league play in 1994–95.

Overview
The league was composed of 12 teams. After 33 rounds, Marconi-Fairfield were crowned minor premiers. In the final series, Marconi-Fairfield and the Melbourne Knights contested the 1996 A-League Grand Final, with Melbourne Knights prevailing 2–1.

Teams
Prior to the start of the season, the Newcastle Breakers withdrew from the competition citing financial difficulties. The withdrawal of the Breakers left 13 teams, meaning each team had two byes for the season.

Regular season

League table

Finals series

Grand Final

Individual awards
Johnny Warren Medal: Damian Mori (Adelaide City)
U-21 Player of the Year: Jim Tsekenis (West Adelaide)
Top Scorer: Damian Mori (Adelaide City) – 31 goals
Coach of the Year: John Perin (Adelaide City)

Notes

References
- NSL Awards
Australia - List of final tables (RSSSF)

National Soccer League (Australia) seasons
1996 in Australian soccer
1995 in Australian soccer
Aus
Aus